isl (integer set library) is a portable C library for manipulating sets and relations of integer points bounded by linear constraints.

The following operations are supported:
 intersection, union, set difference
 emptiness check
 convex hull
 (integer) affine hull
 integer projection
 computing the lexicographic minimum using parametric integer programming
 coalescing
 parametric vertex enumeration

It also includes an ILP solver based on generalized basis reduction, transitive closures on maps (which may encode infinite graphs), dependence analysis and bounds on piecewise step-polynomials.

All computations are performed in exact integer arithmetic using GMP or imath.

Many program analysis techniques are based on integer set manipulations. The integers typically represent iterations of a loop nest or elements of an array.
isl uses parametric integer programming to obtain an explicit representation in terms of integer divisions.

It is used as backend polyhedral library in the GCC Graphite framework 
and in the LLVM Polly framework 
for loop optimizations.

See also

 Frameworks supporting the polyhedral model
 Integer programming

References

External links
 Official ISL web site
 ISL source repository
 Integer sets and relations: from high-level modeling to low-level implementation (Sven Verdoolaege)

Computer arithmetic
C (programming language) libraries
Numerical libraries
Free software programmed in C
Software using the MIT license